Capitol Speedway may refer to:
 Capitol Speedway (Wisconsin)
 Capitol Speedway (Alaska), an auto racing track in the United States